Prime Minister of Kurdistan may refer to:
Prime Minister of the Mahabad Republic - Haji Baba Sheikh
Prime Minister of Iraqi Kurdistan